Dysbarism refers to medical conditions resulting from changes in ambient pressure. Various activities are associated with pressure changes. Underwater diving is the most frequently cited example, but pressure changes also affect people who work in other pressurized environments (for example, caisson workers), and people who move between different altitudes.

Ambient pressure 
Ambient pressure is the pressure in the water around the diver (or the air, with caisson workers etc.). As a diver descends, the ambient pressure increases. At  in salt water, it is twice the normal pressure than that at the surface. At 40 meters (a common recommended limit for recreational diving) it is 5 times the pressure than at sea level.

Pressure decreases as we rise above sea level, but less dramatically. At 3000 feet altitude (almost 1000 meters), the ambient pressure is almost 90% of sea level pressure. Ambient pressure does not drop to 50% of sea level pressure until 20,000 feet or 6,000 meters altitude.

Effects of pressure on the body

Direct effects on tissues 
This is not of practical importance, because the body is mostly composed of barely compressible materials such as water. People often wonder whether scuba divers feel their body being crushed by the pressure, but divers would have to reach depths of thousands of feet before their flesh began to suffer significant compression.

Gas filled spaces 
Gas is very compressible. Humans have many air spaces: sinuses, middle ears, gas in our bowels, cavities in our teeth, and largest of all, our lungs. On land in our daily lives, the pressure in our air spaces is usually exactly the same as the pressure outside, because our air spaces are connected to the outside world. If there was a pressure difference between the outside world and one of our air spaces, then we experience painful pressure on the walls of that air space, as air pushes from the higher-pressure side to the lower-pressure side. This is why we sometimes get painful ears on air trips.

Dissolved gas 
A percentage of the gas we breathe (air) is always dissolved in our blood, like the gas dissolved in a carbonated drink bottle with the lid on. If a person moves to a higher ambient pressure, then the gas inhaled is at a higher pressure, so more of it dissolves in the blood and diffuses into body tissues (Henry's and Fick's gas laws). If they slowly move back to a lower pressure, then the extra gas comes out slowly until they are back to their normal amount of dissolved gas. But if they move quickly to a lower ambient pressure, then the gas comes out of our blood and tissues violently, in large bubbles, in the same way that quickly removing the cap from a bottle of soft drink produces far more bubbles than slowly opening the bottle.

Types of dysbarism 
Different types of illness result from increases in pressure (for example, descent during an underwater dive, descent during a plane flight), versus decreases in pressure (for example, coming up from a caisson, or ascending a mountain). Dysbarism comprises several types of illness:

Decompression sickness (DCS) 

Decompression sickness, also called caisson workers' disease and the bends, is the most well-known complication of scuba diving. It occurs as divers ascend, and often from ascending too fast or without doing decompression stops. Bubbles are large enough and numerous enough to cause physical injury. It is quite possible that all divers have microbubbles in their blood to some extent, but that most of the time these bubbles are so few and so small that they cause no harm. When DCS occurs, bubbles disrupt tissues in the joints, brain, spinal cord, lungs, and other organs. Symptoms vary enormously. DCS may be as subtle as unusual tiredness after a dive, or an aching elbow, or a mottled skin rash. Or, it may present dramatically, with unconsciousness, seizures, paralysis, shortness of breath, or death. Paraplegia is not uncommon.

Nitrogen narcosis 

Nitrogen narcosis is also called “L’ivresse des grandes profondeurs” or "rapture of the deep". Nitrogen comprises 79% of the air, but at surface pressures it has no sedating effect. At greater depths, however, nitrogen affects the brain in the same way as nitrous oxide (also known as laughing gas) and other anaesthetic gases. The effect is similar to the effects of alcohol, and to some extent there is cross-tolerance. Unlike alcohol, the onset and disappearance are near instantaneous. A diver may be quite clear-headed at 20 meters, and yet giddy and silly at 30 meters. Ascending to 20 meters will almost instantly clear the head.

High pressure nervous syndrome (HPNS)

Barotrauma 

Barotrauma is injury caused by pressure effects on gas spaces. This may occur during ascent or descent. The ears are the most commonly affected body part. The most serious injury is lung barotrauma, which can result in pneumothorax, pneumomediastinum, pneumopericardium, subcutaneous emphysema, and arterial gas embolism. All divers, commercial air travelers, people traveling overland between different altitudes, and people who work in pressurized environments have had to deal with some degree of barotrauma effect upon their ears, sinuses, and other air spaces. At the most extreme, barotrauma can cause ruptured eardrums, bleeding sinuses, exploding tooth cavities, and the lung injuries described above. This is the reason why divers follow a procedure of not holding their breath during ascent. By breathing continuously, they keep the airways open and avoid pressure differences between their lungs and ambient pressure.

Arterial gas embolism (AGE) 

Arterial gas embolism (AGE) is a complication of lung barotrauma of ascent. It occurs when breathing gas is introduced to the circulation on the arterial side via lung over-pressure trauma. AGE can present in similar ways to arterial blockages seen in other medical situations. Affected people may suffer strokes, with paralysis or numbness down one side; they may suffer heart attacks; they may suffer pulmonary embolism with shortness of breath and chest pain. It is often impossible to distinguish AGE from DCS, but luckily it is rarely necessary for physicians to be able to distinguish between the two, as treatment is the same. Sometimes AGE and DCS are lumped into a single entity, Decompression Illness (DCI).

Classification 
In addition to the foregoing, dysbarism is sometimes classified according to the source of the excess gas, with "trapped gas" dysbarism referring to the expansion of pockets that were already in a gaseous state in the body, and "evolved gas" dysbarism referring to gasses (primarily nitrogen or helium) dissolved in the body coming out of solution to form gas bubbles.

See also

References

External links 

Underwater diving safety
Diving medicine